The Legislative Assembly of Saskatchewan is the legislative chamber of the Saskatchewan Legislature in the province of Saskatchewan, Canada. Bills passed by the assembly are given royal assent by the lieutenant governor of Saskatchewan, in the name of the King in Right of Saskatchewan. The assembly meets at the Saskatchewan Legislative Building in Regina.

There are 61 constituencies in the province, which elect members of the Legislative Assembly (MLAs) to the Legislative Assembly. All are single-member districts, though the cities of Regina, Saskatoon and Moose Jaw were in the past represented through multi-member districts, with members elected through Block Voting.

The legislature has been unicameral since its establishment; there has never been a provincial upper house.

The 29th Saskatchewan Legislature was elected at the 2020 Saskatchewan general election.

Assemblies

Party standings
The current party standings in the assembly are as follows:

Members

Member in BOLD CAPS is the Premier of Saskatchewan.
Members in bold are in the Cabinet of Saskatchewan.
Members in italic are Legislative Secretaries to Cabinet Ministers.
† Speaker of the Assembly

Current seating plan

Current Executive Council/Cabinet
For current cabinet see Executive Council of Saskatchewan.

Officers
In September 2013 the assembly established the position of Usher of the Black Rod. Their role is functionally similar to the one for the Senate of Canada. Rick Mantey was the first person to hold the office. The current Usher of the Black Rod, as of 2014, is Ben Walsh.

The Black Rod was made by Scott Olson Goldsmith of Regina.

See also
 List of Saskatchewan general elections
 Saskatchewan Legislative Building
 Monarchy in Saskatchewan
 Politics of Saskatchewan
 Saskatchewan Legislative Network
 Stopping the clock
 Hansard TV

References

External links
 List of MLAs from the Legislative Assembly of Saskatchewan

Politics of Saskatchewan
Saskatchewan
Saskatchewan
Saskatchewan Legislature
1905 establishments in Saskatchewan